Sar Dehlaq (also Romanized as Sardehlāq) is a village in Khodabandehlu Rural District, in the Central District of Sahneh County, Kermanshah Province, Iran. At the 2006 census, its population was 203, in 57 families.

References 

Populated places in Sahneh County